Sister Mary Ignatius Davies (18 November 1921 – 9 February 2003) was a Sister of Mercy and inspirational music teacher known for her work at the Alpha Boys School.

Career
Born Mary Davies in Innswood, Saint Catherine Parish, Jamaica, Davies was baptised at the St. Joseph's Roman Catholic Church in Spanish Town, and went to the St. Catherine Elementary School. After her family moved to Kingston, she attended Mico Elementary School and later the Alpha Academy, the girls' high school attached to the Alpha Boys School. She joined the Sisters of Mercy on 1 February 1939, aged 17, taking the name Ignatius, and lived at the school for the remainder of her life.

She inspired many musicians from the Alpha school to become professional musicians, including future Skatalites Tommy McCook, Don Drummond, and Johnny "Dizzy" Moore, as well as trombonist Rico Rodriguez and Leslie Thompson, who went on to become the first black conductor of the London Symphony Orchestra. She contributed to Island Rock, a documentary series broadcast in 2002 on BBC Radio 2 to mark the 40th anniversary of Jamaican independence.

Sister Mary Ignatius had a large record collection that was the envy of many pupils at the Academy, and was a huge fan of blues and jazz. For many years she operated a sound system on Saturday afternoons at the school, which attracted people from surrounding areas.

While best known for the musicians she taught, she was also involved in teaching football, cricket, boxing, table tennis, and dominoes at the school.

In 1996 she was awarded the Badge of Honour for services to Jamaica.

She died at the University Hospital of the West Indies, Jamaica, on 9 February 2003, aged 81, after suffering a heart attack the day before.

References

External links
 Alpha Old Boys Association

1921 births
2003 deaths
Jamaican educators
Jamaican Roman Catholic religious sisters and nuns
Sisters of Mercy
People from Kingston, Jamaica
Music educators
20th-century Roman Catholic nuns
Women music educators